The Former Tainan Assembly Hall is a former assembly hall in West Central District, Tainan, Taiwan.

History
The building was built in 1911 during the Japanese rule of Taiwan as the first public assembly hall. It is now serves as a venue for art gallery, exhibition and public activity.

Transportation
The building is accessible within walking distance south west of Tainan Station of Taiwan Railways.

See also
 List of tourist attractions in Taiwan

References

1911 establishments in Taiwan
Buildings and structures in Tainan
Buildings and structures completed in 1911
Tourist attractions in Tainan